Valea Podului River may refer to:

 Valea Podului, a tributary of the Mara in Romania
 Valea Podului, a tributary of the Someșul Mare in Romania